Marcus Thomas Barnes (born 1 December 1996) is an English professional footballer who plays as a forward. He is the younger brother of Jamaica international Giles Barnes.

Playing career
Barnes joined the Academy at Southampton in September 2013, and signed his first professional contract upon turning 17 three months later after scoring six goals in his first 13 appearances for the under-18 team. On 5 January 2018, he joined EFL League Two side Yeovil Town on loan until the end of the 2017–18 season. He made his competitive debut the following day against Bradford City in a Third Round FA Cup match at Huish Park, scoring the opening goal in a 2–0 victory.

Barnes appeared as a substitute for the first team on 5 January 2019 in the FA Cup third round against Derby County at Pride Park.

On 22 January 2021, Barnes joined League Two side Oldham Athletic following a successful trial, signing a contract until the end of the 2020–21 season.

On 11 August 2022, Barnes signed with third-tier US side Northern Colorado Hailstorm, who compete in the USL League One.

Personal life
Barnes is of Jamaican descent. He is the younger brother of Jamaica international Giles Barnes.

Career statistics

References

External links
Southampton FC profile

1996 births
Living people
English footballers
Association football forwards
Wolverhampton Wanderers F.C. players
Southampton F.C. players
Yeovil Town F.C. players
Eastleigh F.C. players
Oldham Athletic A.F.C. players
Northern Colorado Hailstorm FC players
Black British sportsmen
English sportspeople of Jamaican descent
English Football League players
National League (English football) players
English expatriate footballers
English expatriate sportspeople in the United States
Expatriate soccer players in the United States